PSAB stands for Persatuan Sepakbola Aceh Besar (en: Football Association of Great Aceh). PSAB Aceh Besar is an  Indonesian football club based in Aceh Besar, Aceh. They play in Liga 3.

References

External links
Liga-Indonesia.co.id

Football clubs in Indonesia
Football clubs in Aceh